Cambodian Australians are Australian citizens who were born, raised in, or from Cambodia usually having Khmer ancestry but also including Chinese Cambodians, Vietnamese Cambodians, Chams and other ethnicities of Cambodia.  The term may also refer to Australians who have ancestors that were born, raised in, or from Cambodia & Vietnam.

History

Prior to 1975, most of the few Cambodians in Australia were children of upper income families or having government funded scholarships sent abroad to attend school. After the fall of Phnom Penh to the communist Khmer Rouge in 1975, a few Cambodians managed to escape, but not until the Khmer Rouge was overthrown in 1979 did large waves of Cambodians began immigrating to Australia as refugees.

In order to encourage rapid assimilation into Australian culture and to spread the economic impact, Australian government settled the 10,000 refugees in various towns and cities throughout the country.

However, once established enough to be able to communicate and travel, many Cambodians began migrating within Australia to certain localities where the climate was more like home, where they knew friends and relatives had been sent, or where there were rumored to be familiar jobs or higher government benefits.

Consequently, large communities of Cambodians took root in major cities such as Sydney, Melbourne, Brisbane and Adelaide. The suburb of Springvale in Melbourne has a notably large Cambodian population.

Notable people 
 
Hong Lim
Son Chhay
Ung Huot
Neil Prakash
Kith Meng
Meng Heang Tak

See also

Asian Australians
Diaspora studies
Demographics of Cambodia
Australia–Cambodia relations

References

External links
  (Cambodians in Sydney) [CC-By-SA] 

Australia
Asian Australian
Australia–Cambodia relations